Slunga is a Finnish surname. Notable people with the surname include:

Anna Slunga-Tallberg (born 1962), Finnish sailor
Riikka Slunga-Poutsalo (born 1971), Finnish politician

Finnish-language surnames